Sara and Dara dolls are Iranian toys.  They were first introduced in March 2002, as an alternative to the Barbie doll.  100,000 of the dolls were made in the first round of production by a manufacturer in Hong Kong.  The dolls cost less than Barbie dolls, and are meant to promote Persian culture, even though they have not been as successful.   Sara and Dara are available in different styles, modeled after a traditional clothing.

Gender 
Sara is a girl doll while Dara is a boy doll.

Timeline

2012 
Iranian government issues a ban over Unislamic dolls such as Barbie.

See also
 Fulla a 29 cm doll - an Islamic doll
 Sara & Dara 29 cm dolls - Islamic dolls - Iran
 Jenny a 27 cm doll
 Barbie a 29 cm doll
 Bratz a 25 cm doll
 Licca-chan a 21 cm doll - Japan
 Anko 29 cm dolls with guide dogs

References

Products introduced in 2002
Fashion dolls
Playscale figures
Iranian brands